Padang Lawas may refer to:

 Padang Lawas Regency, North Sumatra, Indonesia
 Padang Lawas archaeological site, Indonesia